Rögnvaldsson may refer to:

Echmarcach Rognvaldsson (died 1064), dominant figure in the eleventh-century Irish Sea region
Eiríkur Rögnvaldsson (born 1955), Icelandic linguist, professor of Icelandic at the University of Iceland
Guðrøðr Rǫgnvaldsson (died 1231), AKA Guðrøðr Dond, ruler of the Kingdom of the Isles
Hallad Rognvaldsson, Norse jarl ruling the archipelagos of Orkney and Shetland
Jón Rögnvaldsson (died 1625), alleged Icelandic sorcerer
Petur Rognvaldsson (1934–2007), Icelandic-born athlete and actor
Robert Rognvaldsson (died between 928 and 933), Viking who became the first ruler of Normandy

See also
Ronaldson